Haggerstone Island is a privately owned resort island,  southeast of Cape Grenville in the Great Barrier Reef Marine Park of Far North Queensland, Australia.

It is owned by Roy and Anna Turner.

See also

List of islands of Australia

References

Islands on the Great Barrier Reef
Private islands of Australia
Islands of Far North Queensland
Places in the Great Barrier Reef Marine Park